Suoxi Valley is a valley in Zhangjiajie, in Hunan province, China.

The meaning of the name is: 'fog laden place' in the Tujia language.

Zhangjiajie
Landforms of Hunan
Valleys of China